Stephen Webber (born 1983) is an American politician in Missouri

Stephen Webber may also refer to:

 Steve Webber (1947–2022), American baseball pitching coach
 Stephen Webber (De Bortoli Wines) (born 1965), Australian co-manager of De Bortoli Wines

Fictional Characters
 Steven Webber, fictional character since 1977 on the American daytime television drama General Hospital

See also
 Steven Weber (disambiguation)
 Stephen Weber, French actor, see The Man at Midnight